Serbia is a member state of several international organizations (intergovernmental organizations):

International organizations
United Nations (UN)
Council of Europe (CoE), European cooperation
Organization for Security and Co-operation in Europe (OSCE), security
Central European Initiative (CEI), forum of regional cooperation
South-East European Cooperation Process (SEECP), forum of regional cooperation
Central European Free Trade Agreement (CEFTA), trade agreement between non-EU countries
Southeast European Cooperative Initiative (SECI), security
Organization of the Black Sea Economic Cooperation (BSEC), political and economic cooperation
Regional Cooperation Council (RCC), forum of regional cooperation
Partnership for Peace (PfP), NATO program
Euro-Atlantic Partnership Council (EAPC), NATO program
Interpol, security
International Criminal Court (ICC), international tribunal
World Customs Organization (WCO), trade

Conferences
2014 Conference of Western Balkan States, Berlin
2015 Western Balkans Summit, Vienna
2016 Western Balkans Summit, Paris
2017 Western Balkans Summit, Trieste
2018 Western Balkans Summit, London

Defunct
Stability Pact for South Eastern Europe

Future
Accession of Serbia to the European Union

Foreign relations of Serbia
Politics of Serbia
Membership in intergovernmental organizations by state